Seneca One Tower is a skyscraper located in downtown Buffalo, New York. The building was formerly known as One HSBC Center (1999–2013) and prior to that, as Marine Midland Center (1972–1999), its name was changed in 1999 shortly after Marine Midland's parent company HSBC re-branded the bank as HSBC Bank USA. It is an example of modern architecture. The building's design is similar to that of the 33 South Sixth building in Minneapolis, which was designed by the same architectural firm.

In 2021, the entire tower and 4 mezzanine floors were finished being renovated as part of a $150 million renovation by Douglas Development, which included adding over 200 prime rate apartments.

Building facts
The building was designed by Skidmore Owings & Merrill (SOM) and completed in 1972, with the interiors completed in 1974. The lead architect was Marc Goldstein; John Merrill was partner-in-charge. The interiors were designed by Davis Allen and Margo Grant Walsh. 
The tower was the world headquarters of Marine Midland until 1998, and served as the headquarters of HSBC USA until 1999, when it moved its U. S. headquarters to New York City.
Seneca One Tower is the tallest (privately owned) office building outside of NYC in New York State. The tallest publicly owned building outside of NYC is Erastus Corning Tower in Albany, New York.
The building's plaza hosts Ronald Bladen's monumental 1973 work titled "Vroom, Shhh."
The building spans the southern end of Main Street, under which the Buffalo Metro Rail passes.
Due to the large number of railroad overpasses in Erie County, the skyscraper can also be seen from many vantage points along Harlem Road, Union Road, the 400 expressway (as far away as Elma), areas nearby Highmark Stadium (particularly the Lake Avenue and Abbott Road intersection), to the south as far away as Chestnut Ridge Road, and the Grand Island bridges along the Niagara section of the Thruway from the north. It can also be seen looking west from Route 77 in Bennington and Attica, near the windmills. The building can also be seen from the Fallsview hotels on the Canadian side of Niagara Falls.
The building was renovated by the Buffalo-based Architecture firm, Antunovich Associates. 
M&T Bank Tech Hub, also designed by Antunovich Associates, moved into Seneca One in November 2020.

Broadcast towers atop the building
WBXZ-LD (TV 56)
W275BB (FM 102.9), relays WECK
W227BW (FM 93.3), relays WZXV

Current tenants
The following is a list of significant tenants :

 M&T Bank
 43 North
 Odoo
Serendipity Labs
 AML RightSource
 PCI
Douglas Development Buffalo

Significant former tenants
Consulate General of Canada in Buffalo
HSBC Bank USA
Pegula Sports and Entertainment
Phillips Lytle LLP

History
On December 5, 2012, HSBC Bank USA announced that they would vacate the space it leased in the tower by the time their lease expires in October 2013. Paired with the departure of Phillips Lytle LLP, and the recent closing of the Canadian Consulate, the tower was 90 percent vacant as of 2014. In August 2016, it was announced that Washington, D.C. based Douglas Development will buy One Seneca tower. On September 29, 2016, Buffalo Business First reported that Douglas Jemal of Washington, D.C. had completed the purchase of One Seneca Tower and an adjacent parking ramp with plans to redevelop the tower and plaza into a mixed-use complex including retail, restaurant, hotel, office and apartment components.

In June 2019, M&T Bank announced it would occupy 15 of the tower's floors as the bank's "technology hub." In 2020, the building gained a paint scheme of terra cotta and gunmetal. In early 2021 an illuminated M&T Bank sign was added to the top of the building, replacing a Buffalo Bills pennant (a promotional courtesy of the local Oxford Pennant Company) that was temporarily introduced for the team's 2020 season playoff run between the AFC Wild Card and AFC Championship rounds.

Gallery

See also
 HSBC Buildings around the world
 List of tallest buildings in Buffalo
 List of tallest buildings in Upstate New York

References

External links

 Skyscraperpage building page
 Emporis building page

HSBC buildings and structures
Skyscraper office buildings in Buffalo, New York
Skidmore, Owings & Merrill buildings
Office buildings completed in 1970